James Arthur Proctor (born September 9, 1935) is an American former professional baseball player who played two games for the Detroit Tigers during the  season. He was born in Brandywine, Maryland.

Proctor's professional career began with the Negro league Indianapolis Clowns.

References

External links

1935 births
Living people
Major League Baseball pitchers
Baseball players from Maryland
Detroit Tigers players
Salt Lake City Bees players
Knoxville Smokies players
West Palm Beach Indians players
Terre Haute Tigers players
Augusta Tigers players
Charleston Senators players
Indianapolis Clowns players
Lancaster Red Roses players
Victoria Rosebuds players
Houston Buffaloes players
People from Brandywine, Maryland
21st-century African-American people
American expatriate baseball players in Nicaragua
African-American baseball players